George Marston (October 15, 1821 – August 14, 1883), was a lawyer who served in various political offices, including as the Attorney General of Massachusetts.

Early life
Marston was born to Charles Marston in Barnstable, Massachusetts on October 15, 1821.

Elected offices
In 1850 Marston was elected the District Attorney for the Southern District, he also served as the Judge of Probate of Barnstable County, Massachusetts, and the Registrar of Probate of Barnstable County, Massachusetts. In 1879 Marston was elected Attorney General of Massachusetts, he was re elected in 1880 and 1881.

Death
Marston died in New Bedford, Massachusetts on August 14, 1883.

Footnotes

 

1821 births
People from Barnstable, Massachusetts
Massachusetts lawyers
Harvard Law School alumni
Massachusetts Attorneys General
1883 deaths
19th-century American politicians
19th-century American lawyers